Asoke Kumar Bhattacharyya (1 February 1919 – 11 June 2016) was an Indian archaeologist, museologist, art historian and professor of Sanskrit. He was the Director of the Indian Museum, Kolkata for a decade till his retirement. The Indian government awarded him Padma Shri in April 2017 posthumously.

Bhattacharyya has to his credit 29 published books on various aspects of art, archaeology, epigraphy and numismatics and hundreds of research articles in journals across the world. In 2012, he was awarded the Acharya Hemchandra Suri Samman Puraskar, New Delhi for his outstanding contribution to Jaina iconography.

Biography
Bhattacharyya was born in north Calcutta, to professor Harimohan Bhattacharyya on 1 February 1919. He studied in South Suburban School, Scottish Church College, completed him Master of Arts in Sanskrit from Calcutta University in 1941 with major in Epigraphy and iconography. He completed his Master of Arts in Arabic-Persian History in 1952. He was a gold medalist in both of his master's degrees. Meanwhile, he was honoured with Kabitirtha and Purantirtha. He completed Law in 1944. He received the Premchand Roychand Scholarship in 1949. He joined the Indian Museum as assistant curator in 1949. Later on from 1965 to 1975 he was the Director of the Indian Museum till retirement.

He died on 11 June 2016 at his residence in Lake Gardens, Kolkata.

Books
His books include:
 A Corpus of Dedicatory Inscriptions from Temples of West Bengal, c. 1500 A.D. to c. 1800 A.D. 1982
 A Pageant of Indian Culture : art and archaeology 1995  
 Cultural, Historical, and Political Aspects of Perso-Arabic Epigraphy in India 1999 
 Indian Contribution to the Development of Far Eastern Buddhist Iconography 2002 
 Early and Buddhist Stone Sculpture of Japan 2004 
 Buddhist Iconography in Thailand : a South East Asian perspective 2007 
 Indian Numismatics And Its Cultural Aspects 2010 
 Historical Development Of Jaina Iconography: A Comprehensive Study 2010

References

1919 births
2016 deaths
20th-century Indian archaeologists
Indian museologists
Indian art historians
Recipients of the Padma Shri in other fields
Scottish Church College alumni
University of Calcutta alumni
Indian historians
20th-century Indian historians
21st-century Indian historians
21st-century Indian archaeologists
Indian archaeologists
Indian Sanskrit scholars
Sanskrit scholars from Bengal
Sanskrit scholars
20th-century Bengalis
21st-century Bengalis
Bengali Hindus
Scholars from Kolkata
Bengali writers
Indian male writers
20th-century Indian writers
21st-century Indian writers
20th-century Indian male writers
21st-century Indian male writers
Bengali historians
West Bengal academics
Indian art writers